Populism exists in Europe.

19th and 20th centuries

In the Russian Empire during the late 19th century, the narodnichestvo movement emerged, championing the cause of the empire's peasantry against the governing elites. The movement was unable to secure its objectives, however it inspired other agrarian movements across eastern Europe in the early 20th century. Although the Russian movement was primarily a movement of the middle class and intellectuals "going to the people", in some respects their agrarian populism was similar to that of the U.S. People's Party, with both presenting small farmers (the peasantry in Europe) as the foundation of society and main source of societal morality. According to Eatwell, the narodniks "are often seen as the first populist movement".

In German-speaking Europe, the völkisch movement has often been characterised as populist, with its exultation of the German people and its anti-elitist attacks on capitalism and Jews. In France, the Boulangist movement also utilised populist rhetoric and themes. In the early 20th century, adherents of both Marxism and Fascism flirted with populism, but both movements remained ultimately elitist, emphasising the idea of a small elite who should guide and govern society. Among Marxists, the emphasis on class struggle and the idea that the working classes are affected by false consciousness are also antithetical to populist ideas.

In the years following the Second World War, populism was largely absent from Europe, in part due to the domination of elitist Marxism-Leninism in Eastern Europe and a desire to emphasise moderation among many West European political parties. However, over the coming decades, a number of right-wing populist parties emerged throughout the continent. These were largely isolated and mostly reflected a conservative agricultural backlash against the centralisation and politicisation of the agricultural sector then occurring. These included Guglielmo Giannini's Common Man's Front in 1940s Italy, Pierre Poujade's Union for the Defense of Tradesmen and Artisans in late 1950s France, Hendrik Koekoek's Farmers' Party of the 1960s Netherlands, and Mogens Glistrup's Progress Party of 1970s Denmark. Between the late 1960s and the early 1980s there also came a concerted populist critique of society from Europe's New Left, including from the new social movements and from the early Green parties. However it was only in the late 1990s, according to Mudde and Rovira Kaltwasser, that populism became "a relevant political force in Europe", one which could have a significant impact on mainstream politics.

Following the fall of the Soviet Union and the Eastern Bloc of the early 1990s, there was a rise in populism across much of Central and Eastern Europe. In the first multiparty elections in many of these countries, various parties portrayed themselves as representatives of "the people" against the "elite", representing the old governing Marxist-Leninist parties. The Czech Civic Forum party for instance campaigned on the slogan "Parties are for party members, Civic Forum is for everybody". Many populists in this region claimed that a "real" revolution had not occurred during the transition from Marxist-Leninist to liberal democratic governance in the early 1990s and that it was they who were campaigning for such a change. The collapse of Marxism-Leninism as a central force in socialist politics also led to a broader growth of left-wing populism across Europe, reflected in groups like the Dutch Socialist Party, Scottish Socialist Party, and German's The Left party. Since the late 1980s, populist experiences emerged in Spain around the figures of José María Ruiz Mateos, Jesús Gil and Mario Conde, businessmen who entered politics chiefly to defend their personal economic interests, but by the turn of the millennium their proposals had proved to meet a limited support at the ballots at the national level.

Germany 

Friedrich Ludwig Jahn (1778–1852), a Lutheran Minister, a professor at the University of Berlin and the "father of gymnastics", introduced the concept of Volkstum, a racial notion which draws on the essence of a people that was lost during the Industrial Revolution. Adam Mueller went a step further by positing the belief that the state was a larger totality than the government institutions. This paternalistic vision of aristocracy concerned with social orders had a dark side in that the opposite force of modernity was represented by the Jews, who were said to be eating away at the state. Populism also played a role in mobilizing middle class support for the Nazi Party in Weimar Germany.

21st century

At the turn of the 21st century, populist rhetoric and movements became increasingly apparent in Western Europe. Populist rhetoric was often used by opposition parties. For example, in the 2001 electoral campaign, the Conservative Party leader William Hague accused Tony Blair's governing Labour Party government of representing "the condescending liberal elite". Hague repeatedly referring to it as "metropolitan", implying that it was out of touch with "the people", who in Conservative discourse are represented by "Middle England". Blair's government also employed populist rhetoric; in outlining legislation to curtail fox hunting on animal welfare grounds, it presented itself as championing the desires of the majority against the upper-classes who engaged in the sport. Blair's rhetoric has been characterised as the adoption of a populist style rather than the expression of an underlying populist ideology.

By the 21st century, European populism was again associated largely with the political right. The term came to be used in reference both to radical right groups like Jörg Haider's FPÖ in Austria and Jean-Marie Le Pen's FN in France, as well as to non-radical right-wing groups like Silvio Berlusconi's Forza Italia or Pim Fortuyn's LPF in the Netherlands. The populist radical right combined populism with authoritarianism and nativism.  Conversely, the Great Recession also resulted in the emergence of left-wing populist groups in parts of Europe, most notably the Syriza party which gained political office in Greece and the Podemos party in Spain, displaying similarities with the US-based Occupy movement. Like Europe's right-wing populists, these groups also expressed Eurosceptic sentiment towards the European Union, albeit largely from a socialist and anti-austerity perspective rather than the nationalist perspective adopted by their right-wing counterparts.

Austria 
The Austrian Freedom party (FPO) was formed from the remnants of the longstanding League of Independents (VdU). The party was primarily made up of German Nationalists and former Nazis who saw Austria both as part of the German Kulturnation and as its own, self-governing state. In its contemporary form, the party is characterized by Austrian nationalism, Euroscepticism, anti-immigration, and anti-islamic attitudes (all traits commonly associated with right-wing populist ideologies).

Italy 

When Silvio Berlusconi entered politics in 1994 with his new party Forza Italia, he created a new kind of populism focused on media control. Berlusconi and his allies won three elections, in 1994, 2001 and, with his new right-wing People of Freedom party, in 2008; he was Prime Minister of Italy for almost ten years. Throughout its existence, Berlusconi's party was characterised by a strong reliance on the personal image and charisma of its leader—it has therefore been called a "personality party" or Berlusconi's "personal party"—and the skillful use of media campaigns, especially via television. The party's organisation and ideology depended heavily on its leader. Its appeal to voters was based on Berlusconi's personality more than on its ideology or programme.

Italy’s most prominent right-wing populist party is Lega Nord (LN). The League started as a federalist, regionalist and sometimes secessionist party, founded in 1991 as a federation of several regional parties of Northern and Central Italy, most of which had arisen and expanded during the 1980s. LN's program advocates the transformation of Italy into a federal state, fiscal federalism and greater regional autonomy, especially for the Northern regions. At times, the party has advocated for the secession of the North, which it calls Padania. Certain LN members have been known to publicly deploy the offensive slur "terrone", a common pejorative term for Southern Italians that is evocative of negative Southern Italian stereotypes. With the rise of immigration into Italy since the late 1990s, LN has increasingly turned its attention to criticizing mass immigration to Italy. The LN, which also opposes illegal immigration, is critical of Islam and proposes Italy's exit from the eurozone. Since 2013, under the leadership of Matteo Salvini, the party has to some extent embraced Italian nationalism and emphasised Euroscepticism, opposition to immigration and other "populist" policies, while forming an alliance with right-wing populist parties in Europe.

In 2009, former comedian, blogger and activist Beppe Grillo founded the Five Star Movement. It advocates direct democracy and free access to the Internet, and condemns corruption. The M5S's programme also contains elements of both left-wing and right-wing populism and American-style libertarianism. The party is considered populist, ecologist, and partially Eurosceptic. Grillo himself described the Five Star Movement as being populist in nature during a political meeting he held in Rome on 30 October 2013. In the 2013 Italian election the Five Star Movement gained 25.5% of the vote, with 109 deputies and 54 senators, becoming the main populist and Eurosceptic party in the European Union.

The 2018 Italian general election was characterized by a strong showing by populist movements like Salvini’s League and Luigi Di Maio’s Five Stars. In June, the two populist parties formed a government led by Giuseppe Conte.

United Kingdom 

The UK Labour Party under the leadership of Jeremy Corbyn has been called populist, with the slogan "for the many not the few" having been used.

Brexit

Populism and its influence on the 2016 UK referendum on membership of the European Union 
The United Kingdom Independence Party (UKIP) had been characterised as a right-wing populist party. with it achieving increased success leading up to the Brexit referendum due to this adoption of populism under the direction of Nigel Farage from 2006 with the party highly capitalising on the increasing immigration concerns in the UK following the EU enlargement of 2004. After the 2016 UK referendum on membership of the European Union, in which British citizens voted to leave, some have claimed the "Brexit" as a victory for populism, encouraging a flurry of calls for referendums among other EU countries by populist political parties.

The populist Brexit Party was founded for the 2019 European Parliament elections in the United Kingdom.

In 2021, the YouGov-Cambridge Globalism Project's annual populism tracker found populist beliefs in broadly sustained decline over three years in 10 European countries. Political scientists said the results showed "a clear pattern of decreasing support for populism".

References

Populism